Amour Oral is rap trio Loco Locass' second studio album.

The group won two awards for the album at the Felix Awards in 2005: Album of the Year - Hip Hop and Songwriter of the Year.

At the MIMI (Initiative musicale internationale de Montréal) gala in 2005, the group was awarded with Song of the Year for "Libérez-nous des libéraux," as well as "Mots-dits, for the depth and refinement of the delivery of the text."

The album also won a Grafika award for best CD/DVD cover in 2005.

Having crossed the threshold of 50,000 copies sold, Amour Oral has been certified gold.

Track listing

References 

Loco Locass albums
2004 albums
Audiogram (label) albums